Sriman Hiranyagarbha Ravikula Raja Muthu Vijaya Raghunatha Raja Raghunatha Deva Kilavan Setupati (r. 1671–1710) was the first king of Ramnad Kingdom which is also known "Maravar Kingdom". He ruled from 1673 to 1708 and oversaw the growth of the feudal chieftainship of Ramnad into a powerful "Ramnad Kingdom" which is known as "Maravar Kingdom". He rescued  the Nayak of Madurai from the tyranny of Rustam Khan and also successfully campaigned against the King of Thanjavur, who later ceded all his territories. It is recorded in the Sethupati copper plates that he belonged to the Surya kulam and Kashyap gothram.

Personal life

He fell in love with Kathali, a girl from the Kallar caste, later married her and then appointed his brother-in-law as the chief of Pudukottai for the military provided by tondaiman. He christened him Ragunatha Tondaman in lieu of his former chief Pallavaraya Tondaman whom he had replaced. Ragunatha Tondaman would later go on to spawn the Thondaman Dynasty of Pudukottai.  Also, history states that he had many wives (more than 45) and when Kilavan Sethupathi expired, all of them committed Sati ("Udankattai").

Reign 
He was a loyal vassal of Chokkanatha Nayak, a Nayak king who conferred him the title of Para Rajakesari ("lion to alien kings"). He helped the Nayaks by defeating the Muslims under Kutbkhan and the poligar of Ettapuram around the time when mughals under Aurangzeb were also waging campaigns in South India. In appreciation of Kilavan's help the Nayak ruler gave the privilege of celebrating Navarathri festival at the capital city. The Nayak ruler also granted places like Thirubhuvanam, Mannar Koil Tiruchuli to Kilavan. He helped Thirumalai Nayak in his war against Mysore army. Thirumalai Nayak recognized the valuable military services of Raghunatha Sethupathi and conferred the title Thirumalai Sethupathi on him. Sethupathis loyalty towards the Nayaks was over with Thirumalai Nayak. Raghunatha Sethupathi recaptured all the forts and places from the Nayaks and became an independent ruler. 

Raghunatha annexed some territories of Madurai Kingdom. Aranthangi, Thirumayam, Piranmalai. He opposed the spread of Christian missionary activities. Kilavan Sethupathi liberated the Marava country (area around Rameswaram) from the control of Madurai Nayak. After defeating Rani Mangammal’s army, he declared independent Marava country in 1707. He shifted his headquarters from Pugalur to Ramnad. Kilavan Sethupathi established the Nalcottal palayam (later Sivaganga) and appointed Udaya Thevar as governor. He endowed villages to a temple at Thiruvadanai and Kalaiyar Koil. He constructed a fort around the Ramanathapuram, the capital city. He constructed a dam across the Vaigai.

It was during his reign, that the capital was moved from Pogalur to Ramnad. He was succeeded by his adopted son Vijaya Raghunatha Sethupathi I.

Death and war of succession

Bhavani Shankar revolted against Raghunatha Kilavan in 1720, after securing the help of the Thanjavur Maratha king Serfoji I and Raja of Pudukkottai, invaded Vijayaraghunatha Sethupathi's seat at Aranthangi. While defending the city, Vijayaraghunatha Sethupathi fell victim to plague and died. Just before his death, Vijayaraghunatha Sethupathi nominated Tanda Deva, a great-grandson of Raghunatha Kilavan's father to succeed him but before he could acceded to the throne, Bhavani Shankar overthrew him with the support and influence of one of Kilavan's concubines.

See also
 Ramnad Kingdom
 Sethupathi, title of Raghunatha Kilavan and his descendants
 Maravar, community to which Ramnad / Sethupathi kings belonged 
 Thanjavur Nayak kingdom, once and ally and later adversary of Sethupathis
 Madurai Nayak dynasty, once and ally and later adversary of Sethupathis
 Marava War of Succession, war of succession after Vijaya Raghunatha Sethupathi

References

History of Tamil Nadu
1710 deaths